Jane K Hart is a Professor of Physical Geography in the School of Geography and Environmental Science at the University of Southampton UK. She has a BSc in Physical Geography from the University of Reading and a PhD in Glaciology from the University of East Anglia. She was Lecturer in Physical Geography at the University of Manchester(1988–89). Currently, she is EGU General Secretary, President of the Quaternary Research Association (QRA) and Chair of the "Funds for Women Graduates". 

Jane Hart's research is in glacial sedimentology and Environmental Sensor Networks and informatics. In glacial sedimentology and glaciology, the research is concerned with the formation of till (glacial sediments), glaciotectonics and links between subglacial processes and climate change. Her research has been carried out at numerous modern day glaciers including Iceland, Greenland, Svalbard, Norway and Alaska; as well as Quaternary (Ice Age) sediments from Norfolk, Wales, Ireland, Germany, USA and New Zealand. She is particularly concerned with the quantification of subglacial processes, highlighted from her research on in situ subglacial experiments, ground penetrating radar (GPR), time –lapse cameras and UAV surveying.

She has pioneered the development of Environmental Sensor Networks (wireless sensor networks) for studying/monitoring the environment, particularly in relation to glaciers and climate change. She co-leads the Glacsweb projectwhich was the first project to develop a wireless sensor network to study glacier processes. A key part of this project was the design and deployment of in situ probes within the ice and the till which measured glacier processes and relayed the data 'live' via the internet (Briksdalsbreen, Norway, 2003-2006); Skalafellsjokull, Iceland 2008-2015). This was followed by the Mountain Sensing projectto use Internet of Things ((IoT)) technology to monitor climate change on the Cairngorm Plateau, Scotland (2013–15). She is currently co-leading a project which uses low cost IoT-enabled Real Time Kinematic Global Navigation Satellite System systems to measure glacier velocity, and so investigate the use of drones to install sensors in remote locations.

Jane was elected to be EGU General Secretary 2022-24. She is an active member of the Earth and Space Science Informatics (ESSI) section at the American Geophysical Union and EGU European Geophysical Union. She is the co-founder of the series of conferences on Environmental Sensor Networks since 2004, she was on the AGU ESSI Programme Committee (2017-2020), and on the AGU ESSI Executive committee, as Chair of the Programme Committee (2018–19), was the EGU representative (2020–21) and Chair of the Lepkoukh Award Committee (2020-21) and currently on the Edward A. Flinn award committee. She was also the Deputy President of EGU ESSI (2020-21).

She is the President of the Quaternary Research Association (2023-26). Prior to that she was Vice-President of the QRA (2019-22) and Chair of the inaugural Quaternary Research Association EDI committee.

In 2022 she was appointed onto the NERC Advisory Network, and has been on  the “NERC Constructing a Digital Environment Expert Network’ as a Senior Panel Member (2019-2022, 2022-2024). She is currently Deputy Head of School (Education), formally Head of Research Group  in the School of Geography and Environmental Science, University of Southampton.  She is also on the national Geography Accreditation Review Panel, which is run by the Royal Geographical Society – Institute of British Geographers (2019-22).

She is also an advocate for women’s rights and education. She has been actively involved with “Funds for Women Graduates”, a UK Charity which supports women postgraduates, and she is the current Chair of the Governors. She was one of the founding members of the University of Southampton 'Women in Science Engineering & Technology (WiSET)' group, jointly began the annual Campbell Lecture (celebration of Women in Science) and has been the chair of WiSET twice.

Prizes

 Wiley Prize (1991) - for best paper published in the journal Earth Surface Processes and Landforms
 European Academic Software Award prize winner (1998) - for the CD-ROM Glacial Analysis published by Routledge.

National and International activities

 Editorial Board - Journal of Glaciology 2004 - 2012
 President of the British Branch of the International Glaciological Society 1997-1999.
 President of Geology Section of British Association for the Advancement of Science 2006-2007
 President of Geological Society of Norfolk 2012-2013
 “Funds for Women Graduates” (UK Charity to support Women Postgraduate Students), Chair of the Grants Committee (2012- 2017), Trustee (2017–2019), Chair of Governors (2020–23).
 American Geophysical Union Chair Earth and Space Science Informatics Programme Committee (2018–19)
 Royal Geographical Society Programme Accreditation Review panel member (2019-2022)
 Vice-president Quaternary Research Association (2019-2022) and Chair of EDI Committee
 NERC Constructing a Digital Environment Expert Network – Senior Panel Member (2019-)
 Deputy President Earth and Space Science Informatics (ESSI), European Geophisical Union (2020–21).
 RGS-IBG Programme Accreditation Review Panel (2020-23)
 Chair AGU Lepkouth Awards committee  (2021)
 Chair ESF Panel B (2022)
 Member NERC Advisory Network (2022-24)
 Member of AGU Edward A. Flinn award Committee (2022-)
 General Secretary of the European Geoscience Union (2022-24)
 President of the Quaternary Research Association (2023-26).

Key Publications

 Hart, J.K., Young, D.S., Baurley, N. R., Robson, B. and Martinez K (2022). The seasonal evolution of subglacial drainage pathways beneath a soft bedded glacier. Nature Communications Earth & Environment, 3, 1-3.
 Hart JK, Martinez K, Young DS, Basford P, Robson B & Clayton A 2019a: Surface melt driven summer diurnal and winter multi-day stick-slip motion and till sedimentology. Nature Communications, 10, 1599.
 Hart JK, Martinez K, Basford PJ, Clayton AI, Bragg G M, Ward T & Young DS 2019b: Surface melt-driven seasonal behaviour (englacial and subglacial) from a soft-bedded temperate glacier recorded by in situ   wireless probes. Earth Surface Processes and Landforms.
 Hart JK, Clayton AI, Martinez K & Robson BA 2018: Erosional and depositional subglacial streamlining processes at Skálafellsjökull, Iceland: an analogue for a new bedform continuum model. GFF, DOI: 10.1080/11035897.2018.1477830.
 Martinez K, Hart JK, Basford PJ, Bragg GM, Ward T & Young DS 2017: A geophone wireless sensor network for investigating glacier stick-slip motion. Computers & Geosciences, 105, 103-112.
 Hart, J.K., 2017. Subglacial till formation: Microscale processes within the subglacial shear zone. 
 Young D, Hart JK & Martinez K 2015: Image analysis techniques to estimate river discharge using time-lapse cameras in remote locations. Computers & Geosciences 76, 1-10. (doi:10.1016/j.cageo.2014.11.008).
 Hart JK & Martinez K 2015: Towards an Environmental Internet of Things (IoT). Earth and Space Science 2, 194-200.doi:10.1002/2014EA000044.
 Hart JK, Rose KC, Waller RI, Vaughan-Hirsch D & Martinez K. 2011: Assessing the catastrophic break up of Briksdalsbreen, Norway, associated with rapid climate change.  J. Geol. Society of London 168 1–16. 
 Hart JK, Rose KC & Martinez K 2011: Subglacial till behaviour derived from in situ wireless multi-sensor subglacial probes: Rheology, hydro-mechanical interactions and till formation. Quat. Sci.Rev.30  234-247.
 Hart JK, Rose KC & Martinez K 2011:Temporal englacial and subglacial water variability associated with a rapidly retreating glacier. Earth Surface Processes & Landforms 36 1230–1239.
 Hart JK, Rose KC, Martinez K & Ong R 2009:Subglacial clast behaviour and its implication for till fabric development: new results derived from wireless subglacial probe experiments. QSR 28 597-607. 
 Rose KC, Hart JK & Martinez K 2009: Seasonal changes in basal conditions at Briksdalsbreen, Norway: the winter–spring transition. Boreas 38 579-590. 
 Hart JK & Martinez K 2006: Environmental Sensor Networks: A revolution in the Earth System Science? Earth-Science Reviews 78,177-191.
 Hart JK, Martinez K, Ong R, Riddoch  A, Rose K & Padhy P 2006: An autonomous multi-sensor subglacial probe: Design and preliminary results from Briksdalsbreen, Norway. Journal of Glaciology  52 389 – 397.
 Martinez K, Hart JK & Ong R 2004: Environmental Sensor Networks. Computer 37 (8), 50-56. 
 Hart JK 1997: The relationship between drumlins and other forms of subglacial def. QSR 16 93-108. 
 Hart JK 1995: An investigation of the deforming layer/debris-rich ice continuum, illustrated from three Alaskan glaciers. Journal of Glaciology 41 619-633. 
 Hart JK 1994: Till fabric associated with deformable beds. Earth Surf. Proc. & Land. 19 15-32. 
 Hart JK & Roberts DH 1994:  Criteria to distinguish between subglacial glaciotectonic and glaciomarine sedimentation: I - Deformational styles and sedimentology. Sed. Geology 91 191-214. 
 Hart JK & Boulton GS 1991: The interrelationship between glaciotectonic deformation and glaciodeposition. Quaternary Science Reviews 10 335-350.
 Hart JK, Hindmarsh RCA & Boulton GS 1990: Different styles of subglacial glaciotectonic deformation in the context of the Anglian ice sheet. Earth Surface Processes and Landforms 15 227-242.

References

External links
 home page
 Glacsweb
 Google Scholar Entry

Living people
Year of birth missing (living people)
Academics of the University of Southampton
Alumni of the University of East Anglia